Gmina Frampol is an urban-rural gmina (administrative district) in Biłgoraj County, Lublin Voivodeship, in eastern Poland.

Villages
Apart from the town of Frampol, Gmina Frampol contains the villages and settlements of Cacanin, Chłopków, Karolówka, Kąty, Kolonia Kąty, Komodzianka, Korytków Mały, Niemirów, Pulczynów, Radzięcin, Rzeczyce, Smoryń, Sokołówka, Sokołówka-Kolonia, Stara Wieś, Teodorówka, Teodorówka-Kolonia, Wola Kątecka and Wola Radzięcka.

Neighbouring gminas
Gmina Frampol is bordered by the gminas of Biłgoraj, Dzwola, Goraj and Radecznica.

References
Polish official population figures 2006

Frampol
Biłgoraj County